Jay Clarke may refer to:

 Jay Clarke, real name of author Michael Slade
 Jay Clarke, American musician also known as Ash Black Bufflo
 Jay Clarke, real name of English DJ Jodie Harsh
 Jay Clarke (tennis), British tennis player
Nig Clarke, Jay "Nig" Clarke, baseball player

See also
Jay Clark (disambiguation)
Jason Clarke (disambiguation)